This article shows Sporting Clube de Portugal's player statistics and all matches that the club played during the 2016–17 season.

Pre-season and friendlies

Competitions

Overall record

Primeira Liga

League table

Results by round

Matches

Taça de Portugal

Third round

Fourth round

Fifth round

Quarter-finals

Taça da Liga

Third round

UEFA Champions League

Group stage

Players

Squad statistics

Starting lineup only

|}

Transfers

In

Out

References

External links
 Official club website 

2016-17
Sporting
Sporting Lisbon